Ceratina hieroglyphica, is a species of bee belonging to the family Apidae, subfamily Xylocopinae.

References

External links
 Animaldiversity.org
 Itis.gov
 Academia.edu

hieroglyphica
Insects described in 1854